Jarocin  is a village in the administrative district of Gmina Braniewo, within Braniewo County, Warmian-Masurian Voivodeship, in northern Poland and is close to the border with the Kaliningrad Oblast of Russia.

The village has a population of 180 people.

References

Jarocin